"You Can't Fix This" is a 2013 song by Stevie Nicks, Dave Grohl, Taylor Hawkins, and Rami Jaffee. The song was recorded in Dave Grohl’s Studio 606 and recorded for the soundtrack album Sound City: Real to Reel.

The song peaked on the Belgium charts at number 47.

Writing and recording
The song was written about Nicks' godson Glen B. Parrish, Jr. who overdosed at a party at the age of 18. The song was recorded in Dave Grohl’s Studio 606. The Sound City players played the song several times at festivals and on The Late Show with David Letterman.

Charts

References

External links
stevienicksofficial.com

Stevie Nicks songs
2011 songs
2013 singles
Songs written by Stevie Nicks
Songs written by Dave Grohl
Songs written by Taylor Hawkins
Song recordings produced by Butch Vig
RCA Records singles